Uroplatus finiavana is a species of lizard in the family Gekkonidae.It is endemic to Madagascar.

References

Uroplatus
Geckos of Africa
Reptiles of Madagascar
Endemic fauna of Madagascar
Taxa named by Angelica Crottini
Taxa named by Frank Glaw
Taxa named by Miguel Vences
Reptiles described in 2011